General elections were held in Liechtenstein on 6 February 1949. The Progressive Citizens' Party won eight of the 15 seats in the Landtag, but remained in coalition with the Patriotic Union.

Results

By electoral district

References

Liechtenstein
General election
Elections in Liechtenstein
Liechtenstein general election